Wardojo (EYD: Wardoyo; 20 August 1933 – 27 July 2008) was an Indonesian politician who served as the 19th Minister of Agriculture from 1988 until 1993. A member of the Golkar political party, he previously served as the 3rd Junior Minister of Agriculture from 1983 until 1988. He died on 27 July 2008, and was buried in the Kalibata Heroes Cemetery.

References 

1933 births
2008 deaths
Golkar politicians
Agriculture ministers of Indonesia
People from Klaten Regency
Politicians from Central Java
Gadjah Mada University alumni